The First McGowan Ministry was the 36th ministry of the Government of Western Australia. Led by the Premier Mark McGowan and Deputy Premier Roger Cook, it succeeded the Barnett Ministry following the 2017 election.

Governor Kerry Sanderson designated 17 principal executive offices of the Government under section 43(2) of the Constitution Acts Amendment Act 1899.

Notes

 On 22 March 2017, five days after the ministry was sworn in, Peter Tinley relinquished the Mines and Petroleum portfolio, to allay any concerns of a conflict of interest due to a family member working in the oil and gas industry. Tinley exchanged portfolios with Bill Johnston, taking on Johnston's Housing portfolio with Johnston taking Mines and Petroleum.
On 13 December 2018 a cabinet reshuffle occurred. Bill Johnston gained Energy  relinquished the Electoral Affairs, Commerce and Asian Engagement portfolios to Stephen Dawson, John Quigley and Peter Tinley respectively. Rita Saffioti relinquished Lands to Treasurer Ben Wyatt and Ports to Alannah MacTiernan.

References

Australian Labor Party ministries in Western Australia
Western Australian ministries
2017 establishments in Australia
2021 disestablishments in Australia
Ministries of Elizabeth II